Sylte may refer to:

Places
Sylte, Fræna, a village in Fræna, Møre og Romsdal, Norway
Sylte, Norddal, a village in Norddal, Møre og Romsdal, Norway
Sylte, Surnadal, a village in Surnadal, Møre og Romsdal, Norway
Sylte, Vanylven, a village in Vanylven, Møre og Romsdal, Norway
Sylte, Trollhättan, a village in Trollhättan, Västra Götaland, Sweden
Tresfjord, a former municipality in Møre og Romsdal, Norway (called Sylte between 1899 and 1922)

Other
Tommy Sylte, footballer
Oskar Sylte Mineralvannfabrikk, company